This list includes of all the 96 fighter aces of World War II from Finland. For other countries see List of World War II aces by country

Finnish fighter aces

With specific aircraft types

Fokker D.XXI

Below are all the Finnish aces who have won victories with the Fokker D.XXI

Gloster Gladiator

Below are all the Finnish aces who have won victories with the Gloster Gladiator.

Fiat G.50

Below are all the Finnish aces who have won victories with the Fiat G.50 Freccia

Morane-Saulnier MS.406

Below are all the Finnish aces who have won victories with the Morane-Saulnier MS.406

Brewster Buffalo

Below are all the Finnish aces who have won victories with the Brewster Buffalo

Curtiss Hawk 75

Below are all the Finnish aces who have won victories with the Curtiss Hawk 75

Messerschmitt Bf 109

Below are all the Finnish aces who have won victories with the Messerschmitt Bf 109

Notes

References

Stenman, Kari and Keskinen, Kalevi: Aircraft of the Aces 23 - Finnish Aces of World War 2, Osprey Publishing, 1998, 
Stenman, Kari, Keskinen, Kalevi, and Niska, Klaus: Hävittäjä-Ässät - Suomen Ilmavoimien Historia 11, Apali, 1994, 

Finland
Finnish military personnel
Finnish military-related lists
Lists of Finnish people by occupation